South Lake Hollingsworth (also known as SoHo by Lakeland residents) is a suburb of the city of Lakeland, Florida, two miles south of downtown Lakeland. It is bordered by Hollingsworth Oaks Dr. on the north, Denton St./Easton Dr. on the south, and Brandon Rd. on the west. SoHo encompasses a quarter of Lake Hollingsworth's shoreline and is located in the 33803 zip code.

References

Lakeland, Florida